Accident on the Rampe de Laffrey can refer to one of several deadly accidents that have occurred along the Rampe de Laffrey, one of the most dangerous stretches of road in France:
Accident on the Rampe de Laffrey (1946), in which 18 were killed
Accident on the Rampe de Laffrey (1973), in which 43 died
Accident on the Rampe de Laffrey (1975), in which 29 were killed
Accident on the Rampe de Laffrey (2007), in which 26 died